Overson is a surname. Notable people with the surname include:

 Richard Overson (born 1959), English footballer
 Vince Overson (born 1962), English footballer and manager

See also
 Iverson (surname)